William Lyman is the name of:

William Lyman (congressman) (1755–1811), U.S. Congressman from Massachusetts
William Lyman (inventor) (1821–1891), American inventor of a rotating-wheel can opener
William Whittingham Lyman (1850–1921), American winemaker in California
William Whittingham Lyman, Jr. (1885–1983), American academic and Celtic scholar
William R. Lyman (1898–1972), American football player